Jamie White Oglesby, Sr. (January 2, 1929 – January 2, 2013) was an American politician from the state of Georgia. He served two terms in the Georgia House of Representatives from 1964 to 1968, becoming the first elected minority leader in the House in decades and the first elected minority leader of the Republican caucus. An alumnus of the University of North Georgia, he bought and operated the Liberal Kansas Memorial Granite Service until he served in the US Army as a second lieutenant in the Korean War. When he returned from the war, he returned to operating another memorial stone business and worked with his wife as realtors. He served as a delegate to the 1964 and 1968 Republican National Conventions.

References

Republican Party members of the Georgia House of Representatives
1929 births
2013 deaths
University of North Georgia alumni